Ill-Natured Spiritual Invasion is the third studio album by Norwegian black metal band Old Man's Child. Most of the vocals were improvised by Galder while in the studio.

Track listing 
All music, lyrics and arrangements by Galder.
 "Towards Eternity" – 5:17
 "The Dream Ghost" – 3:41
 "Demoniacal Possession" – 3:31
 "Fall of Man" – 4:00
 "Captives of Humanity" – 4:42
 "God of Impiety" – 5:23
 "My Evil Revelations" – 3:59
 "Thy Servant" – 4:46

Credits 
 Galder – vocals, guitars, bass and synth
 Gene Hoglan – drums (incorrectly credited as Gene Hogland)

Additional personnel
 Christophe Szpajdel — logo

References

Old Man's Child albums
1998 albums
Century Media Records albums